Floriane Liborio (born 16 March 1988 in Toulouse) is a French taekwondo practitioner. Liborio won the bronze medal in the women's bantamweight (under 53 kg) division at the 2013 World Taekwondo Championships in Puebla.

References

External links
 

1988 births
Living people
French female taekwondo practitioners
Taekwondo practitioners at the 2015 European Games
European Games competitors for France
World Taekwondo Championships medalists
European Taekwondo Championships medalists
21st-century French women